Hope Christian School is a private, co-educational, non-denominational Christian school  in Albuquerque, New Mexico, USA. It has a 40+ year history and is the largest private school in New Mexico. Hope educates approximately 1300 students per year from Pre-K through 12th grade. Hope is known for its accelerated curricula, championship athletics, award-winning arts and biblical worldview approach to everything curricular and extracurricular.

History
Hope was founded in 1976 by Wayne Ehlert to provide a non-denominational Christian education to students in Albuquerque. Beginning as a high school, Hope expanded to include middle school grades in 1981 and grades 1–5 in 1982, eventually adding kindergarten and preschool as well.  As enrollment increased over time, the single campus was no longer sufficient for the school's needs. In the late 1990s the school purchased a nearby church and its adjacent land. This land, located just northwest of the original campus, was developed into an elementary school campus that opened to students in fall 1997. In early 2002, the school purchased a plot of land just north of the main high school campus, which now houses the middle-school campus.

Campuses
Hope currently houses three campuses along Palomas Avenue in northeast Albuquerque, parallel to Paseo Del Norte between San Pedro and Louisiana.  The Elementary Campus houses grades K-5, as well as Hope Preschool (Preschool and Pre-K, ages 3–4).  The Middle School Campus on the corner of Paseo and Louisiana houses grades 6–8. The High School houses grades 9-12.

Academics
Hope Christian has maintained a 98% college-bound graduation rate.  Hope offers Honors and Advanced Placement (AP) courses, as well as dual-credit courses.  In 2017, the graduating class was offered $9.5 million in college scholarships.

Students are trained in a variety of fields. Hope relies on a combination of curricula in the lower grades, as well as a variety of both secular and religious textbooks in the upper grades. The elementary combination curriculum includes the A Beka, Bob Jones, and ACSI curricula.  All education is taught from a Biblical worldview but a non-denominational perspective. The approach to science, like all other subjects, is Bible-based.

Athletics
Hope High School is a NMAA 4A class school offering 23 Varsity sports and a long list of championship titles. As of 2016 it boasted 26 boys athletic state championships and 56 girls athletic state championships. Hope's drill team, the Huskettes, has had 23 winning seasons.  Hope's basketball team is a recognized leader among state high school basketball teams, with over 700 boys basketball games wins under the leadership of Coach Jim Murphy.

Hope has offered its student body on the middle school and high school campuses a wide selection of sports for boys and girls for years, including a football program which began in 2009. It also now offers a wide range of athletics on the Elementary campus as well, through APIAL.   Hope maintains a "no-cut" policy in many sports so that each student can have the full benefit of being on a team.

Controversy
In 2012 Hope Christian School denied acceptance to a 3-year-old wishing to attend the school because the child had gay parents. The school issued an explanation which stated that "same gender couples are inconsistent with scriptural lifestyle and biblical teachings".

External links

References

	

High schools in Albuquerque, New Mexico
Middle schools in Albuquerque, New Mexico
Private elementary schools in New Mexico
Private middle schools in New Mexico
Private high schools in New Mexico
Christian schools in New Mexico